Alay is a district of Osh Region in south-western Kyrgyzstan. The capital lies at Gülchö. The Alay District borders with China in the east, Tajikistan in the south, Chong-Alay District in the west, Nookat District in the north-west, Kara-Suu District and Özgön District in the north, and Kara-Kulja District in the north-east.

Demographics
According to the Population and Housing Census of 2009, the resident population of Alay District was 72,170. 1,427 people lived in urban areas, and 70,743 in rural ones. According to the 2009 Census, the ethnic composition of the Alay District (de jure population) was 99.6% Kyrgyz and 0.4% other groups.

Rural communities and villages

In total Alay District include 62 settlements in 14 rural communities. Each rural community can consist of one or several villages. The rural communities in Alay District are:

 K. Belekbaev (seat: Sopu-Korgon; incl. Askaly, Jerge-Tal, Kolduk, Targalak, Terek and Chiy-Talaa)
 Budalyk (seat: Kara-Suu; incl. Kaynama, Tamga-Terek, Kum-Shoro, Oktyabr and Oro-Döbö)
 Bülölü (seat: Koshulush; incl. Kichi-Bülölü, Köl-Chaty and Chong-Bülölü)
 Gülchö (seat: Gülchö; incl. Kara-Bulak, Jyly-Suu, Tash-Koroo, Chakmak and Kurmanjan Datka)
 Jangy-Alay (seat: Jangy-Alay; incl. Jangy-Aryk)
 Josholu (seat: Jangy-Turmush; incl. Ayuu-Tapan, Kommunizm, Lenin-Jol, Miyazdy, Orto-Suu and Osoaviakhim)
 Kabylan-Kol (seat: Kabylan-Kol; incl. Künggöy, Kara-Jygach and Kurulush)
 Kongur-Döbö (seat: Boz-Karagan; incl. Jar-Kyshtak, Kara-Shoro, Arpa-Tektir and Kyzyl-Oy)
 Korul (seat: Toguz-Bulak; incl. Keng-Jylga, Birinchi May and Aral)
 Lenin (seat: Gagarin; incl. Kün-Elek, Murdash and Sogondu)
 Sary-Mogol (seat: Sary-Mogol)
 Sary-Tash (seat: Sary-Tash; incl. Kök-Suu and Nura)
 Taldy-Suu (seat: Taldy-Suu; incl. Archa-Bulak, Kök-Bulak, Kurgak and Sary-Mogol)
 Üch-Döbö (seat: Kichi-Karakol; incl. Ak-Bosogo, Ak-Jay, Gejige, Kyzyl-Alay and Chong-Karakol)

References 

Districts of Osh Region